The Constitution of East Timor entered into force on 20 May 2002, and was the country's first constitution after it gained independence from Portugal in 1975 and from Indonesia, which invaded East Timor on 7 December 1975 and left in 1999 following a UN-sponsored referendum.

History
The Constitution was drafted by the Constituent Assembly elected for this purpose in 2001. Pursuant to an UNTAET regulation, the constitution did not need support in a referendum, but entered into force on the day of independence of East Timor after it was approved by the assembly.

There are two versions of the Constitution, one in each of the country's official languages, Tetum and Portuguese.

The Constitution consists of seven parts, namely:
 I. Fundamental principles
 II. Fundamental rights, duties, liberties and guarantees
 III. Organisation of political power (including the provisions about the three branches of government)
 IV. Economic and financial organisation
 V. National defence and security
 VI. Guarantee and revision of the Constitution
 VII. Final and transitional provisions

References

External links
 Text of the Constitution in English: 
 http://timor-leste.gov.tl (pdf)
 www.constituteproject.org (pdf)
 Text of the Constitution in Portuguese (pdf)
 Text of the Constitution in Tetum (pdf)

East Timor
Politics of East Timor